Desmond N'Ze Kouassi (born 17 April 1989) known as Desmond N'Ze or just Desmond in Japan, is a former professional footballer who played as a centre-back. Born in Ghana, he is a naturalized Italian citizen.

Career

Hellas Verona
N'Ze made his debut for Hellas Verona on 18 November 2006, coming on as a 27th-minute substitute in his side's 3-0 loss to Rimini. La Gazzetta dello Sport gave a 6 out of 10 score for his debut.

Inter Milan
After just one appearance for Hellas Verona first team, N'Ze signed for the reserve team of Inter Milan in January 2008 on an 18-month contract.

Avellino
After failing to make any appearances for the Inter Milan first team, Desmond signed for Serie B side Avellino in co-ownership deal. His debut was on 20 September 2008, coming on as an 85th-minute substitute is his side's 2-1 loss to AlbinoLeffe. N'Ze was an unused bench in 2008–09 Coppa Italia on 20 August; the club was eliminated by Reggiana. N'Ze made a total of ten appearances for the side in Serie B. In June 2009 Inter gave up the remain 50% registration rights to Avellino. However Avellino bankrupted at the start of season.

Valle del Giovenco
In January 2010, Desmond joined Valle del Giovenco. He made his debut on 17 January 2010, drawing 0-0 to Portosummaga; La Gazzetta rated his debut 7 out of 10 scores. However, he only played 5 more times for VdG. The team also bankrupted at the start of next season.

Milazzo
In March 2011 N'Ze joined Milazzo. He made his debut on 27 March 2011 against Vibonese. In the next season N'Ze played all 4 games in 2011–12 Coppa Italia Lega Pro and 19 games in 2011–12 Lega Pro Seconda Divisione.

Once again Milazzo bankrupted in July 2012.

Fujieda MYCFC
In August 2012, Desmond joined Japan Football League side Fujieda MYFC. He made his debut on 16 September 2012, playing the whole ninety minutes as Fujieda MYFC drew 0–0 with Zweigen Kanazawa. On 20 January 2014, he left the club.

FC Gifu
In January 2013, Desmond joined FC Gifu on loan to the end of 2013. He made his debut on 3 March 2013 against Yokohama FC, losing the game 2-0. On 31 March 2013, he was sent off after receiving two yellow cards in Gifu's 3-0 loss to Tokyo Verdy. He scored his first goal for the club on 17 April 2013, scoring in a 3-2 loss against Kataller Toyama.

Return to Fujieda MYFC
On 1 May 2014, Fujieda MYFC announced that they had re-signed Desmond to play in their inaugural season in the J3 League. On 4 August 2014, it was announced that Desmond had left the club.

Personal life 
He also holds Italian nationality. His brother Marcus N'Ze is also a professional footballer.

In 2014, N'Ze began working for his friend Mario Balotelli as a personal assistant. He was notably his personal chauffeur at Liverpool, being frequently spotted sleeping in the passenger seat of Balotelli's Ferrari in Melwood's car park, waiting for his friend to finish training.

Career statistics

References

External links
 AIC profile (data by football.it) 

Italian footballers
Hellas Verona F.C. players
Inter Milan players
U.S. Avellino 1912 players
S.S. Milazzo players
Fujieda MYFC players
FC Gifu players
Serie B players
J2 League players
J3 League players
Japan Football League players
Association football central defenders
Ghanaian emigrants to Italy
Italian sportspeople of African descent
Naturalised citizens of Italy
Expatriate footballers in Japan
Italian expatriates in Japan
1989 births
Living people